Salomon Savery (1594–1683) was an engraver from the Northern Netherlands.

Biography
Savery was born in Amsterdam.  According to the RKD he was the son of Jacob Savery, brother to Pieter, Hans II and Jacob II, and nephew of Hans I and Roelant (his godfather), and uncle to Geetruyd, Roelant and Magdalena Roghman. His earliest dated print is from 1610, after a work by his uncle Joos Goeimare. He travelled to England in 1632.  At times he collaborated with Pieter Quast. He died in Haarlem.

References

Salomon Savery on Artnet

1594 births
1683 deaths
Engravers from Amsterdam